Michael Sinclair MacAuslan Shea,  (10 May 1938 – 17 October 2009) was Press Secretary to Queen Elizabeth II from 1978 to 1987. Earlier he had been a career diplomat and was also an author of political thrillers and non-fiction.

Early life
Until the age of 14 Shea attended Lenzie Academy, where his mother was a teacher. He then attended Gordonstoun as a result of gaining a scholarship. He graduated from the University of Edinburgh, having read Economics; he also completed his doctorate at University of Edinburgh on economic development in West Africa. He was commissioned during his National Service into the Royal Corps of Signals in 1957.  He entered the Foreign Service in 1963 and served in Ghana, West Germany, Romania and New York.

Royal press secretary
After helping to arrange the Queen's official visit to the United States Bicentennial celebrations in 1976, Shea became her press secretary two years later. He was at the centre of a "mole hunt" in 1986 for the person who gave a briefing to a journalist on The Sunday Times in which it was said that the social policies being followed by the Thatcher government were causing the Queen "dismay", and that Margaret Thatcher's negative attitude to the Commonwealth of Nations caused displeasure. Members of Parliament called for Shea's resignation if he was responsible. The Queen's Private Secretary, Sir William Heseltine, responded to the controversy in a letter to The Times confirming Shea as the contact, but asserting that Shea's comments had been misreported. 

Shea left royal service the following year; some sources indicated that he was "dropped" from the role. He continued to deny that there was any connection with the earlier controversy. He was not knighted but was made a Lieutenant of the Victorian Order (LVO) in 1985 and Commander (CVO) in 1987.

Other activities
While First Secretary in Bonn, then the capital of West Germany, Shea began his career as a writer. A thriller, Sonntag, was published under the pseudonym Michael Sinclair in 1971, the first of 20 books, most of them political thrillers, some set in the near future. State of the Nation (1997)  and Endgame (2002) take place in an independent Scotland. His memoirs were published as A View from the Sidelines (2003).

After he resigned as the Queen's press secretary, Shea worked for six years at Hanson plc as director of public relations. He can be heard in a private interview given to Brendan Bruce  (former Conservative Party Director of Communications under Margaret Thatcher) for his book Images of Power (Kogan Page 1992) in the British Library Sound Archive. Other activities included service with National Galleries of Scotland as a trustee, with the Royal Edinburgh Military Tattoo as a director, and with the Royal Lyceum Theatre as chairman. Shea was also among the group that revived the Edinburgh Oyster Club. 

Michael Shea married Mona Grec Stensen, a native of Norway, in 1968. The couple had two daughters. 

His last years were affected by the onset of dementia. He died at age 71 in 2009.

In popular culture
Shea was portrayed by Nicholas Farrell in episode 8 of series 4 of The Crown, in a storyline focusing on apartheid and the alleged rift between Margaret Thatcher and Queen Elizabeth II.

Partial bibliography

Fiction
 Sonntag (Littlehampton, 1971) [as by Michael Sinclair]
 Norslag (Littlehampton, 1972) [as by Michael Sinclair]
 Long Time Sleeping (Littlehampton, 1975) [as by Michael Sinclair]
 Tomorrow's Men (Weidenfeld & Nicolson, 1982)
 Spin Doctor (HarperCollins, 1996)
 The British Ambassador (HarperCollins, 1997)
 State of the Nation (HarperCollins, 1997)
 The Berlin Embassy (HarperCollins, 1999)
 The Shadows Fall (Severn House, 1999)
 Spinoff (HarperCollins, 2000)
 A Cold Conspiracy (Severn House, 2000)
 Break Point (Severn House, 2001)
 The Danube Enigma (Severn House, 2001)
 Endgame (Severn House, 2002)

Non-fiction
 Influence: How to Make The System Work for You – a handbook for the modern Machiavelli (Ebury, 1988)
 Personal Impact: Presence, Paralanguage and the Art of Good Communication (Sinclair-Stevenson, 1993)
 To Lie Abroad: Diplomacy Reviewed (Sinclair-Stevenson, 1996)
 The Primacy Effect: The Ultimate Guide to Effective Personal Communications (Orion, 1998)
 A View from the Sidelines (Sutton, 2003)

References

Further reading
 Palmer,  Dean. The Queen and Mrs Thatcher (2016) excerpt

1938 births
2009 deaths
Alumni of the University of Edinburgh
British diplomats
Members of the British Royal Household
People educated at Gordonstoun
People educated at Lenzie Academy
People from Carluke
Scottish thriller writers
Commanders of the Royal Victorian Order
Scottish science fiction writers
20th-century Scottish novelists
Scottish male novelists
20th-century British male writers
20th-century British Army personnel
Royal Corps of Signals soldiers